The Ligue's cup, is an ice hockey competition in France. The competition organized by the Fédération Française de Hockey sur Glace.

Previous winners

External links
French ice hockey federation

Ice hockey competitions in France